Pessac-Léognan is a wine growing area and Appellation d'Origine Contrôlée, in the northern part of the Graves region of Bordeaux. Unlike most Bordeaux appellations, Pessac-Léognan is equally famous for both red and (dry) white wines, although red wine is still predominant.  It includes the only red-wine producer outside the Haut-Médoc classified in the Bordeaux Wine Official Classification of 1855, the premier cru Château Haut-Brion, and also includes all of the châteaux listed in the 1953/59 classification of Graves.  These classed growths account for a third of the wine produced in Pessac-Léognan.

Geography
Pessac-Léognan, France lies on the left bank of the Garonne.  It is immediately south of the city of Bordeaux (with a small portion to the west): indeed some of the northern vineyards of Pessac-Léognan are completely surrounded by the housing estates of Bordeaux, as a result of the city's southward expansion.  It consists of 8 communes: (from north to south) Mérignac, Talence, Pessac, Gradignan, Villenave-d'Ornon, Cadaujac, Léognan and Martillac.  A significant part of the area is forested.  It includes 1580 hectares of vines.  The soil is very gravelly.

History
Pessac-Léognan has a long wine-making history.  Red wine from this region (and the rest of Graves) was the wine originally loved by the English as claret, during the 300 years that Aquitaine was under English rule, from 1152 to 1453.  The area includes the oldest named property in Bordeaux, Château Pape Clément, founded by Pope Clement V in 1306. In the mid-seventeenth century, Château Haut-Brion became the first château of international renown, being praised by Samuel Pepys in 1663, while the Médoc was still swamp.

However, the appellation of Pessac-Léognan is relatively recent, dating to 1987.  Before then, the area was part of the Graves AOC, and known informally as Haut-Graves.

Wine

Red wine
As with the Médoc to the north, Cabernet Sauvignon is the predominant grape, but a somewhat greater proportion of Merlot is typically used in the blend.  Cabernet Franc is also used, with small amounts of Petit Verdot and Malbec.  Styles vary more widely than in most Bordeaux AOCs, but typical flavours are blackcurrant and cedar, and the wines are often described as 'earthy'.

White wine
Sauvignon blanc and Sémillon are the grapes used, usually blended.  The wine is typically fermented in barrels at a low temperature.  Nectarine is a typical flavor when the wines are young, maturing (over 7–15 years) into flavours of nuts, honey and custard.  They are said to be among France's greatest whites.

Food matching
The traditional pairing for reds is with roast lamb, although they are flexible enough to have with ham, beef or game. The whites complement fish and seafood.

Châteaux

First growth (1855 classification)
Château Haut-Brion

Classed growths (1959 classification) (by commune)

Cadaujac
Château Bouscaut, Château Bardins

Léognan
Domaine de Chevalier, Château Carbonnieux, Château de Fieuzal, Château Haut-Bailly, Château Malartic Lagravière, Château Olivier

Martillac
Château Latour-Martillac, Château Smith Haut Lafitte, Clos Marsalette, Château D'Eyran,

Pessac
Château Haut-Brion, Château Pape Clément, Château Le Sillage, de Malartic

Talence
Château La Mission Haut-Brion, Château Laville Haut-Brion, Château La Tour Haut-Brion

Villenave d'Ornon
Château Couhins, Château Couhins-Lurton

Other notable châteaux
Château Les Carmes Haut-Brion, Château La Louvière, Château Rochemorin, Château Cruzeau, Château Haut-Lagrange

Notes

See also
French wine
Bordeaux wine regions

References

External links
 Union of Classed Growths of Graves official site

Bordeaux AOCs